Regina "Regie" Baff is an American actress. She was nominated for a Tony Award in 1974 for Veronica's Room.

Career
Regina Baff appeared in The West Side Waltz with Katharine Hepburn. She also appeared on film, starring in  Below the Belt (1980) about lady wrestlers (not the porno movie by the same title) and Road Movie (1974), a film by Joseph Strick  about a truck hooker (not the Korean film by the same title). Her other films included Who Is Harry Kellerman and Why Is He Saying Those Terrible Things About Me? (1971), The Paper Chase (1973), The Great Gatsby (1974), Butch and Sundance: The Early Days (1979) and Escape from Alcatraz (1979). On television, she appeared in numerous situation comedies, including an episode of Taxi in which her character gave birth in the backseat of a taxi.

Personal life
Regina Baff has a Ph.D. in psychology, and is sister of Ella Baff, former director of Jacob's Pillow.

Filmography

References

External links

American film actresses
American stage actresses
American television actresses
1949 births
Living people
20th-century American actresses
21st-century American women